The Petit train d'Artouste is a narrow gauge tourist railway situated in the French Pyrenees close to the Spanish border, some  south of the town of Pau, and within the commune of Laruns. It is the second-highest railway in France after the Tramway du Mont-Blanc.

The line was originally constructed for the Compagnie des Chemins de Fer du Midi (CFM), the then main line railway operator in the area to the north of the Pyrenees. As part of a program of electrifying these lines, the CFM constructed a series of hydro-electric power stations in the valley of the Ossau between the years 1920 and 1932. Significant civil engineering works were required in order to provide access to these works, and included the line now used by the petit train. Once this work was finished, the CFM recognised the tourist potential of the line, and the first tourist trains were run.

Today the petit train is reached by a gondola from a lower station at Artouste-Fabrèges, on the Lac de Fabrèges in the valley of the Gave du Brousset. After leaving Ossau2000, the line runs through a  tunnel, crossing under the ridge to reach a point high above the valley of the Gave de Soussouéou, another of the Gave d'Ossau's tributaries. From here the line runs along a twisting and vertiginous ledge above that valley until it reaches the dam of the Lac d'Artouste. The culminating point of the railway, shortly after the starting point, is approximately 1,940 m.

Trains consist of 6 12-seat carriages pulled by a diesel locomotive, and operate from late May or early July until the end of September or early October. On busy days, up to 10 trains are used providing 3 departures per hour, whilst at other times departures are hourly. Trains depart from 08.30 until 14:30 or later in the high season.

Gallery

See also
List of highest railways in Europe

References

External links
 
 Official web site of the Petit train d'Artouste (in French)

500 mm gauge railways in France
Artouste, Petit train d'
Artouste, Petit train d'
Railway companies of France
Tourist attractions in Pyrénées-Atlantiques